Lithium tritelluride is an intercalary compound of lithium and tellurium with empirical formula .  It is one of three known members of the Li-Te system, the others being the raw metals and lithium telluride.  

LiTe3 was first discovered in 1969 by researchers at the US Atomic Energy Commission.  Research into the compound has been primarily driven by the possibility of using molten tellurium salts to cool a nuclear reactor.  

Lithium tritelluride can be synthesized by heating a mixture of the appropriate stoichiometry.  It is unstable below ; if left below that temperature, it will decompose, releasing tellurium vapor.  

Structurally, lithium tritelluride is composed of graphene-like planes of tellurium, arranged in parallel with atoms aligned to form "vertical" columns of tellurium; the lithium ions then form columns running through the center of each tellurium hexagon.

References

Lithium compounds
Tellurium compounds